This is a list of societies that have been described as examples of stateless societies. 

There is no universally accepted definition of what constitutes a state, or to what extent a stateless group must be independent of the de jure or de facto control of states so as to be considered a society by itself.

Historical societies 
The following groups have been cited as examples of stateless societies by some commentators.

Indigenous societies
Human society predates the existence of states, meaning that the history of almost any ethnic group would include pre-state organisation. The groups listed below have been identified as examples of stateless societies by various commentators, including discussions relating to anarchism.

See also

List of anarchist communities
Stateless society
Stateless nation
Statelessness

References 

Stateless societies
Anthropology
Archaeological theory
Statelessness